Blackburn House may refer to:

in Scotland
Blackburn House, West Lothian

in the United States
Blackburn House (Athens, Alabama), listed on the NRHP in Alabama
Blackburn House (Canehill, Arkansas), listed on the NRHP in Arkansas
Blackburn House (Rogers, Arkansas), listed on the NRHP in Arkansas
Edward M. Blackburn House, Midway, Kentucky, listed on the NRHP in Kentucky
Julius Blackburn House, Georgetown, Kentucky, listed on the NRHP in Kentucky
Dr. William and Elizabeth Blackburn House, Pierre, South Dakota, listed on the NRHP in South Dakota
Ambrose Blackburn Farmstead, Gordonsburg, Tennessee, listed on the NRHP in Tennessee
Batte-Brown-Blackburn House, Pulaski, Tennessee, listed on the NRHP in Tennessee